Hartford Township may refer to:

 Hartford Township, Sebastian County, Arkansas, in Sebastian County, Arkansas
 Hartford Township, Adams County, Indiana
 Hartford Township, Iowa County, Iowa
 Hartford Township, Michigan
 Hartford Township, Todd County, Minnesota
 Hartford Township, Pike County, Missouri
 Hartford Township, Licking County, Ohio
 Hartford Township, Trumbull County, Ohio
 Hartford Township, Minnehaha County, South Dakota, in Minnehaha County, South Dakota

Township name disambiguation pages